Noel or Noël may refer to:

Christmas 
 , French for Christmas
 Noel is another name for a Christmas carol

Places 
Noel, Missouri, United States, a city
Noel, Nova Scotia, Canada, a community
1563 Noël, an asteroid
Mount Noel, British Columbia, Canada

People 
Noel (given name)
Noel (surname)

Arts, entertainment, and media

Music 
Noel, another term for a pastorale of a Christmas nature
Noël (Joan Baez album), 1966
Noël (Josh Groban album), 2007
Noel (Noel Pagan album), 1988
Noël (The Priests album), 2010
Noel (Phil Vassar album), 2011
Noel (Josh Wilson album), 2012
Noel, 2015 Christmas album by Detail
"The First Noel", a traditional English Christmas carol
Noël (singer) (active late 1970s), American disco singer
Noel (band), a South Korean group

Television
Noel (TV series), a Philippine drama
"Noël" (The West Wing), a 2000 television episode

Other uses in arts, entertainment, and media 
Noel (film), 2004
Batman: Noël, a 2011 comic by Lee Bermejo
Le Petit Noël or Noël, a Belgian comics series or its eponymous character

Other uses 
Noel (company), a Colombian cookie  manufacturer
NOEL or NOAEL, in toxicology, an acronym for no-observed-adverse-effect level
Hurricane Noel, in the 2007 Atlantic season
Noel baronets, three titles, one extant

See also
Noël Noël, a 2003 Canadian animated short film
Noël-Noël (1897–1989), French actor and screenwriter
Noel! Noel!! Noel!!!, a 2011 holiday album by Michel Legrand
Noell (disambiguation)
Nowell (disambiguation)